Yongchang Subdistrict is a subdistrict of Qidong County in Hunan, China. It was one of four subdistricts approved to establish in 2014. Through the amalgamation of village-level divisions in 2016, the subdistrict of Yongchang has 9 villages and 10 communities under its jurisdiction, its seat is at Shuguang Road.

Subdivisions 
The subdistrict of Yongchang had 20 villages and 10 communities at its establishment in 2014. Its divisions were reduced to 19 from 30 through the amalgamation of villages in 2016, it has 9 villages and 10 communities under its jurisdiction.

9 villages
 Fahua Village
 Goulan Village
 Hongqiaoding Village
 Hutang Village
 Meitangding Village
 Shangshu Village
 Shuangxing Village
 Tongle Village
 Zhaopingpu Village

10 communities
 Huangtupu Community
 Lanzhitang Community
 Liaojia Community
 Qiantang Community
 Shuguang Community
 Taiyangsheng Community
 Wenquan Community
 Yanziyan Community
 Zhapo Community
 Zhujia Community

References 

Qidong County
Subdistricts of Hunan